53 (fifty-three) is the natural number following 52 and preceding 54. It is the 16th prime number.

In mathematics
Fifty-three is the 16th prime number. It is also an Eisenstein prime, an isolated prime, a balanced prime and a Sophie Germain prime.
The sum of the first 53 primes is 5830, which is divisible by 53, a property shared by only a few other numbers.
In hexadecimal, 53 is 35, that is, the same characters used in the decimal representation, but reversed. Four additional multiples of 53 share this property: 371 = , 5141 = , 99,481 = , and 8,520,280 = 0.  Apart from the trivial case of single-digit decimals, no other number has this property. 
53 cannot be expressed as the sum of any integer and its decimal digits, making 53 a self number.
53 is the smallest prime number that does not divide the order of any sporadic group.

In science
The atomic number of iodine

Astronomy
Messier object M53, a magnitude 8.5 globular cluster in the constellation Coma Berenices
The New General Catalogue object NGC 53, a magnitude 12.6 barred spiral galaxy in the constellation Tucana

In other fields
Fifty-three is:

The racing number of Herbie, a fictional Volkswagen Beetle with a mind of his own, first appearing in the 1968 film The Love Bug
The code for international direct dial phone calls to Cuba
53 Days is a northeastern USA rock band
53 Days a novel by Georges Perec
In How the Grinch Stole Christmas!, and its animated TV special adaptation the Grinch says he's put up with the Whos' Christmas cheer for 53 years.
Fictional 53rd Precinct in the Bronx was found in the TV comedy "Car 54, Where Are You?"
"53rd & 3rd" a song by the Ramones
The number of Hail Mary beads on a standard, five decade Catholic Rosary (the Dominican Rosary).
The number of bytes in an Asynchronous Transfer Mode packet.
UDP and TCP port number for the Domain Name System protocol.
53-TET (53 tone, equal temperament) is a musical temperament that has a fifth that is closer to pure than our current system.
53 More Things To Do In Zero Gravity is a book mentioned in The Hitchhiker's Guide to the Galaxy

Sports
The maximum number of players on a National Football League roster
Most points by a rookie in an NBA playoff game, by Philadelphia's Wilt Chamberlain, 1960
Most field goals (three-game series, NBA playoffs), by Michael Jordan, 1992

See also
 List of highways numbered 53

References

Integers